The 2019 Northeast Grand Prix was a sports car race sanctioned by the International Motor Sports Association (IMSA). The race was held at Lime Rock Park in Lakeville, Connecticut on July 20th, 2019, as the eighth round of the 2019 WeatherTech SportsCar Championship, and the fourth round of the 2019 WeatherTech Sprint Cup.

Background
This race is the first of two GT-only races on the 2019 IMSA calendar, in which the prototype classes, Daytona Prototype international (DPi) and Le Mans Prototype (LMP2), will not be taking part. This is in accordance with IMSA's philosophy of occasionally rotating classes out of certain races to reduce costs.

On July 11th, 2019, IMSA released a technical bulletin regarding the Balance of Performance for the race. The GT Le Mans (GTLM) balance of performance constraints would remain as they were in the previous round at Canadian Tire Motorsport Park. In the GT Daytona (GTD) class, after winning the previous round, the BMW M6 GT3 was given a power reduction of 12 horsepower, as well as a 2-liter fuel capacity reduction and a restriction of turbo boost. The Ferrari 488 GT3 and the Porsche 911 GT3 R were made 10 and five kilograms lighter, respectively.

Entries

On July 10th, 2019, the entry list for the event was released, featuring 22 cars. There were eight cars entered in GTLM, and 14 in GTD. The most notable change to the grid included the return of Blancpain GT World Challenge America full-time team Wright Motorsports, with drivers Anthony Imperato and Porsche Junior Professional driver Matt Campbell. Pfaff Motorsports regular driver Scott Hargrove would sit out the Lime Rock Park event as well as the following event at Road America, replaced instead by Porsche Junior driver Dennis Olsen for the Lime Rock event. Olsen and Campbell are set to switch places for Road America. Due to this event happening 50 years and one day after the Apollo 11 moon landing, GTD team Magnus Racing decided to commemorate the anniversary of the mission by launching a one-off livery designed to look like the Saturn V rocket, and run under the number 11. As Magnus Racing usually ran under car number 44, the team received special dispensation by IMSA to count the points they would score as number 11 towards their full-season points under number 44.

Race report

Qualifying results

Results

References

External links

Northeast Grand Prix
Northeast Grand Prix
Northeast Grand Prix
Northeast Grand Prix